Jovan Popović (born 11 May 1987 in Belgrade) is a Serbian rower.

References 
 

1987 births
Living people
Serbian male rowers
Sportspeople from Belgrade
World Rowing Championships medalists for Serbia
European Rowing Championships medalists